Elkrun Township is one of the eighteen townships of Columbiana County, Ohio, United States. The 2010 census reported 4,687 people living in the township, 4,654 of whom were in the unincorporated portion of the township.

Geography
Located in the eastern part of the county, it borders the following townships:
Fairfield Township - north
Unity Township - northeast corner
Middleton Township - east
St. Clair Township - southeast corner
Madison Township - south
Wayne Township - southwest corner
Center Township - west
Salem Township - northwest corner

One village and two unincorporated communities are located in Elkrun Township:
The eastern tip of the village of Lisbon, in the west
The unincorporated community of Elkton, in the center
The unincorporated community of Signal, in the northeast

Name and history

It is the only Elkrun Township statewide, although there are Elk Townships in Noble and Vinton counties. The township was organized in 1806.

Government
The township is governed by a three-member board of trustees, who are elected in November of odd-numbered years to a four-year term beginning on the following January 1. Two are elected in the year after the presidential election and one is elected in the year before it. There is also an elected township fiscal officer, who serves a four-year term beginning on April 1 of the year after the election, which is held in November of the year before the presidential election. Vacancies in the fiscal officership or on the board of trustees are filled by the remaining trustees.

Township Trustees
Anthony G. Sweeney, Chairman
Kurt Seachrist, Vice Chairman
Randy Perrino

Fiscal Officer
Tracey Wonner

Federal government
Federal Correctional Institution Elkton is in the township.

References

External links
County website

Townships in Columbiana County, Ohio
1806 establishments in Ohio
Townships in Ohio